Physematia is a genus of moths of the family Crambidae.

Species
Physematia concordalis Lederer, 1863
Physematia defloralis Strand, 1919

References

Natural History Museum Lepidoptera genus database

Spilomelinae
Crambidae genera
Taxa named by Julius Lederer